Gyrn Wigau is a summit of the Carneddau range in Snowdonia, Wales, and forms a part of the western Carneddau commonly known as the Beras.
It is a top of Drosgl. 
It has only 15 metres of topographical prominence but is listed as a Nuttall.

References

External links
 www.geograph.co.uk : photos of and from Garnedd Uchaf

Llanllechid
Mountains and hills of Gwynedd
Mountains and hills of Snowdonia
Nuttalls